Justice Goodwin or Justice Goodwyn may refer to:

Alfred Goodwin (1923-2022), associate justice of the Supreme Court of Oregon
Daniel Goodwin (Michigan judge) (1799–1887), associate justice of the Michigan Supreme Court
John L. Goodwyn (1903–1968), associate justice of the Alabama Supreme Court
S. Bernard Goodwyn (born 1961), chief justice of the Supreme Court of Virginia

See also
Judge Goodwin (disambiguation)